The 2012 Copa Caixa Stock Car season was from the 34th Stock Car Brasil season. It began on March 25 at the Interlagos and ended on December 9 at the same circuit, after twelve rounds. Chevrolet, came to have Chevrolet Sonic as representation of the manufacturer. The category announced changes for 2012 season, excluding the super final and system of dropped. The scoring system was change with the top twenty drivers in each race are awarded points on a scale of  22, 20, 18, 17, 16, 15, 14, 13, 12, 11, 10, 9, 8, 7, 6, 5, 4, 3, 2 and 1.

After Cacá Bueno, Átila Abreu, Daniel Serra, Ricardo Maurício, Max Wilson, Valdeno Brito and Nonô Figueiredo arrived at 2012 Stock Car Corrida do Milhão with title chances, Bueno of Red Bull Racing won his fifth title. Maurício finished the championship in second place and Abreu in third place.

Teams and drivers
All drivers were Brazilian-registered.

Team changes
Teams of Andreas Mattheis switched places. Mattheis passed Red Bull Racing to A.Mattheis Motorsport and after three seasons and two titles with Red Bull, WA Matheis had a new sponsor of Royal Dutch Shell and renamed the team to Shell Racing.
 Mico's Racing returned after only one race in 2011 with Jacques Villeneuve under Shell V-Power Racing. The team was renamed to Prati-Donaduzzi due sponsor reasons.
Amir Nasr left the championship after eight seasons.
JF started a partner with Nascar Motorsport and was renamed to Comprafacil Nascar JF.
RZ Motorsport returned to his official name, after Crystal left the championship.
FTS Competições and Mobil Super Pioneer parted. Mobil group started a partnership with AMG Motorsport, renaming the team Mobil Super Pioneer Racing and back to operate two cars. FTS Competições started a partner with BMC Group.
Carlos Alves Competições returned to the championship after four seasons. Having sold his car to Carlos Alves, Scuderia 111 left the series.

Driver changes

Cacá Bueno and Daniel Serra still in Mattheis-Red Bull Racing, but, now in A.Mattheis Motorsport after three seasons in WA Mattheis.
Antonio Pizzonia, who raced part time in 2011, moves to Comprafacil JF Nascar. Stock Car Brasil second tier driver Pedro Boesel debuted in the series like Pizzonia's partner.
Denis Navarro moves from RC3 Bassani to Vogel Motorsport in the place of Tuka Rocha, that moves to FTS BMC Racing. Galid Osman returned to the championship like Rocha partner.
Vítor Meira debuted in the series in Officer ProGP replacing Felipe Maluhy, that moves to RC3 Bassani.
Popó Bueno moves from A.Mattheis Motorsport to RZ Motorsport. In his place at Shell-A.Mattheis entered Valdeno Brito, that left FTS Esso Mobil Super Racing.
Nono Figueiredo moves from FTS Esso Mobil Super Racing to AMG Esso Mobil Super Racing.
Diego Nunes moves from RC3 Bassani to Bardahl Hot Car replacing Giuliano Losacco, that moves to RC3 Bassani.
Júlio Campos, who raced for Scuderia 111 and RZ Crystal Racing Team, in 2012 he will race for Carlos Alves Competições. Rodrigo Navarro left JF Racing and will be Campos partner.
Ricardo Sperafico and Rodrigo Sperafico started a partner in Prati-Donaduzzi. Rodrigo left JF Racing Ricardo returned from the championship, after only one race in 2011.

Race calendar and results
All races were held in Brazil.

Championship standings
Points were awarded as follows:

Drivers' Championship

Teams' Championship

References

External links
 Official website of the Stock Car Brasil (in Portuguese)

Stock Car Brasil seasons
Stock Car Brasil season